Andrzej Stanisław Walicki (15 May 1930 – 20 August 2020) was a Polish historian. He was a professor at the University of Notre Dame in Indiana, United States. He specialized in philosophy of sociopolitics, history of Polish and Russian philosophy, Marxism and liberal thought. He was one of the scholars who formed the "Warsaw School of the History of Ideas".

Walicki was born in Warsaw, Poland. He was the son of the art historian, Michał Walicki. He studied at the universities of University of Łódź and Warsaw. He obtained his PhD in 1957, and became a full professor in 1972.

From 1981 to 1986, he lectured at the University of Canberra, and from 1986 at University of Notre Dame. He was awarded a fellowship by the Woodrow Wilson International Center for Scholars in 1978.

In 1998, he won Balzan Prize for his contribution to the study of the Russian and Polish cultural and social history, and also the study of European culture in the 19th century.

Books in English 
 The Slavophile controversy: history of a conservative utopia in nineteenth-century Russian thought (1975)
 A history of Russian thought from the enlightenment to Marxism (1979)
 Philosophy and romantic nationalism: the case of Poland (1982)
 Legal philosophies of Russian liberalism (1987)
 The three traditions in Polish patriotism and their contemporary relevance (1988)
 The Enlightenment and the birth of modern nationhood: Polish political thought from Noble Republicanism to Tadeusz Kosciuszko (1989)
 Stanisław Brzozowski and the Polish beginnings of «Western Marxism» (1989)
 Russia, Poland, and universal regeneration: studies on Russian and Polish thought of the romantic epoch (1991)
 Poland between East and West: the controversies over self-definition and modernization in partitioned Poland (1994)
 Marxism and the leap to the kingdom of freedom: the rise and fall of the Communist utopia (1995)

References

External links 
 Books by Walicki at Polona, including full texts of the Polish editions of many of the books listed above (as well as English texts of Philosophy and Romantic nationalism, Russia, Poland, and universal regeneration, and The Controversy over Capitalism)
 
 Contents 5: The Slavophile Thinkers + the 1863 Polish Question - Andrzej Walicki page 89, Polish Encounters Russian Identity'' (Indiana University Press 2005) https://www.google.com/books/edition/Polish_Encounters_Russian_Identity/ZhWR_QrNxF8C?hl=en&gbpv=1&pg=PA89&printsec=frontcover 
 

1930 births
2020 deaths
20th-century Polish historians
Polish male non-fiction writers
University of Notre Dame faculty
Writers from Warsaw
Academic staff of the University of Canberra